Pipa snethlageae, the Utinga Surinam toad, is a species of frog in the family Pipidae found in Brazil, Colombia, Peru, and possibly Venezuela. Its natural habitats are subtropical or tropical moist lowland forests and freshwater marshes. It is threatened by habitat loss.

References

snethlageae
Amphibians of Brazil
Amphibians of Colombia
Amphibians of Peru
Taxonomy articles created by Polbot
Amphibians described in 1914
Taxa named by Lorenz Müller